Xabier Eizagirre Aizpúrua (born 25 January 1984 in Mutriku, Gipuzkoa) is a Spanish retired footballer who played as a midfielder.

External links
 
 Futbolme profile
 PlayerHistory profile

1984 births
Living people
Spanish footballers
Footballers from the Basque Country (autonomous community)
Association football midfielders
Segunda División players
Segunda División B players
Real Sociedad B footballers
Real Unión footballers
SD Eibar footballers
Barakaldo CF footballers
CD Mirandés footballers
Sestao River footballers
Spain youth international footballers